Yosef Chaim  is the name of:

Chacham Yosef Chaim of Baghdad (1832–1909), better known as the Ben Ish Chai ("Son of Man (who) Lives") He was an Iraqi Halakist and preacher.
Yosef Chaim Brenner (1881–1921), a pioneer in Hebrew literature
Rabbi Yosef Chaim Sonnenfeld (1848–1932), anti-Zionist Rav of Jerusalem